This is a partial, alphabetical list of actual victims whose confidential information was reportedly targeted or actually acquired in conjunction with the news media phone hacking scandal. Dates in parentheses, when included, indicate the approximate time frame during which information was acquired. The reference citations, in many cases, indicate who accessed the individual's information.

The precise number of victims is unknown, but a Commons Home Affairs Select Committee report noted in July 2011 that "as many as 12,800 people may have been victims or affected by phone hacking."

In 2003, a raid by the Information Commissioner's Office (ICO) was made as part of Operation Motorman on the home of private investigator Steve Whittamore. This resulted in seizure of records including more than 13,000 requests for confidential information from newspapers and magazines. In 2006, Information Commissioner Richard Thomas "revealed that hundreds of journalists may have illegally bought private information.

In 2006, the Metropolitan Police Service (Scotland Yard) seized records from another private investigator, Glenn Mulcaire, and found a target list with over 4,000 names on it. Release of "the totality of the Mulcaire information" has not yet been achieved but has been requested through the courts. Accordingly, "the seized material included 4,332 names or partial names; 2,987 mobile phone numbers; 30 audiotapes of varying length; and 91 pin codes of a kind needed to access voicemail with the minority of targets who change the factory settings on their mobile phones."

In contrast, John Yates told the House of Commons Culture, Media and Sport Committee in September 2009 that the police had only found evidence indicating that "it is very few, it is a handful" of persons that had been subject to message interception.

In January 2011, claims made in the suit filed by Kelly Hoppen suggest illegally accessing voicemail occurred as recently as March 2010. Jade Goody believed she and her mother were being hacked as recently as August 2008.

As of June 2011, according to The Guardian, "Scotland Yard is believed to have collected hundreds of thousands of documents during a series of investigations into private investigator Jonathan Rees. Rick Davies, reporter for The Guardian, believes these "boxloads" of paperwork "could include explosive new evidence of illegal news-gathering by the News of the World and other papers." According to his sources, confidential information sold to newspapers may have been obtained through blagging, burglaries, bribery, and blackmail, sometimes involving corrupt customs officers, VAT inspectors, bank employees and police officers.

In July 2011, it was estimated that only 170 people had so far been informed out of the up to 12,800 people that may have been affected by the illegal acquisition of confidential information . In October 2011, it was estimated that only 5%, or about 200, of people whose confidential information had been acquired by Glenn Mulcaire had been notified.

At News Corporation's annual meeting on 21 October 2011, a shareholder asked how the board was conducting its inquiry into the "thousands" of people whose phones were hacked by News of the World journalists. Chairman Rupert Murdoch responded, "It’s not thousands. I’ve not heard that figure before."

On 3 November 2011, Metropolitan Police, referring to the complete list of full names whose phones were possibly hacked by Glenn Mulcaire for News of the World, said "the current number of identifiable persons who appear in the material, and are thus victims, where names are noted, is 5,795. This figure is very likely to be revised in the future as a result of further analysis."  As of 23 July 2012, the Met had identified 4,775 potential victims of phone hacking, of which 2,615 have been notified and 702 people are likely to have been victims.

As of 31 August 2012, the Met had identified 4,744 victims of phone hacking by News of the World whose names and phone numbers had been found in evidence.  Of the victims, 658 had been contacted, but 388 were not contactable and police chose not to contact another 23 "for operational reasons".  Of the victims, 1,894 had been contacted but 1,781 were not contactable.

 Adams, Tony; former England footballer
 Alam, Faria; football association secretary
 Anderson, John; father of Sally King
 Andrew, Sky; football agent
 Archer, Jeffrey; author, politician, convicted perjuror exposed by News of the World.
 Armstrong, Jo; legal adviser to Professional Footballers' Association
 Ash, Leslie and son; actress
 Asprey, Helen; (1 November 2005 to 9 August 2006) aide to Prince Charles
 Badger, Ruth; businesswoman and contestant on The Apprentice.
 Barker, Linda; interior designer and television presenter.
 Beckham, David and Victoria; footballer
 Bell, Stuart; publicist to Sir Paul McCartney
 Best, Calum fashion model, TV personality, son of George Best.
 Betts, Clive; Labour Member of Parliament
 Blackmore, Tony IIes; uncle of Nadine Milroy Sloan, the woman who falsely accused former Tory MP Neil Hamilton and his wife of sexual assault.
 Blackmore, Gillian; wife of Tony Lles Blackmore.
 Blair, Cherie; British barrister married to former Prime Minister Tony Blair
 Blair, Ian; Metropolitan Police Commissioner
 Blair, Tony; former Prime Minister of the United Kingdom
 Blake, John; publisher and former journalist, many of whose books were serialised by News International titles
 Blunkett, David; politician, Home Secretary
 Boffey, Daniel; journalist for The Observer.
 Brash, Lisa; former girlfriend of Robbie Williams.
 Brimelow, Kirsty; prominent criminal barrister who has acted in rape and murder trials.
 Bourret, Caprice; model
 Brooks, Charlie; (late 1990s) EastEnders actor
 Brown, Gordon; Prime Minister
 Bryant, Chris; Labour Member of Parliament
 Burke, James; model.
 Burrell, Paul; former footman for the Queen and later butler to Diana, Princess of Wales
 Campbell, Alastair; former press secretary to Tony Blair
 Campbell, Sol; footballer
 Caplin, Carole; (2002) style adviser to Cherie Blair and a fitness adviser to Tony Blair
 Chapman, Lee; footballer
 Christie, Linford; Olympic athlete
 Church, Charlotte; singer-songwriter, actress and television presenter.
 Clapton, Eric; singer
 Clarke, Charles; Labor MP, home secretary and education secretary to Tony Blair
 Clifford, Max; publicist
 Cole Ashley; footballer
 Colvin, Anne; witness at Tommy Sheridan's libel trial
 Connery, Sir Sean; actor
 Coogan, Steven; comedian, actor, writer and producer
 Cook, David; Metropolitan Police detective chief superintendent
 Cox, Peter; author, literary agent
 Crisan, Cornelia; singer
 Crow, Bob; (late 1990s) General Secretary, Rail Maritime & Transport Union
 Dadge, Paul; (2005) man whose photograph helping 7/7 victims was widely circulated
 Davis, David; politician, shadow Home Secretary
 Davis, Steve; snooker player
 Dearlove, Sir Richard; forensic psychologist working with criminals, and the then head of MI6.
 Dell'Olio, Nancy; property lawyer and girlfriend of England football manager Sven-Göran Eriksson;
 Dowler, Milly; (March 2002) murdered teenager
 Edwards, Alan; founder of the Outside Organization that represented Sir Paul McCartney
 Elliot, Jennifer; daughter of the actor Denholm Elliott
 Eriksson, Sven-Göran; England football manager
 Fallon, Kieren; jockey;
 Families of 9/11 victims; (2001)
 Families of 7/7 victims; (2005)
 Families of UK Soldiers killed in Iraq and Afghanistan
 Family and Friends of Charlotte Coleman; actress
 Family of Madeleine McCann; ( May 2007) missing child
 Family of Jean Charles de Menezes; innocent Brazilian man mistakenly killed by police as a terror suspect
 Family of Robert Kilroy-Silk;
 Family of Soham Children; two 10-year-old Soham girls, Jessica Chapman and Holly Wells, who were abducted and murdered by Ian Huntley on 4 August 2002.
 Family of Peter Sutcliffe, the serial killer
 Feltz, Vanessa; TV and radio presenter
 Ferguson, Sir Alex; Manchester United football manager
 Ferraina,Elisa; died in the attack on New York's World Trade Center on 11 September 2001.
 Field, Mary Ellen; former business manager to Elle Macpherson. Dismissed by Macpherson, who thought Field was providing confidential information to the press and publicly criticized her. Field was reportedly making $250,000 annually before being dismissed and was unable to reestablish her earnings. Glenn Mulcaire later admitted hacking Macpherson's phone.
 Finnigan, Judy; TV presenter
 Frost, Sadie; actress and designer, ex-wife of Jude Law
 Galloway, George; Respect politician
 Gascoigne, Paul; footballer;
 George, Eddie; Governor of the Bank of England;
 Gilchrist, Andy; (2003-2003) union leader; voicemail allegedly accessed by agents of The Sun
 Goody, Jade and her mother, Jackiey Budden; (August 2008) celebrity who may have been hacked in August 2008, while she was dying of cancer.
 Grant, Hugh; actor and film producer
 Gray, Andy; footballer and broadcaster
 Giggs, Ryan footballer
 Hames, Jacqui; TV presenter
 Hammell, Joan; aide to the Deputy Prime Minister John Prescott
 Harrison, George' Beatle for whom the Mirror Group tried but apparently failed to obtain ex-directory numbers.
 Haverson, Paddy; (1 November 2005 to 9 August 2006) communication secretary to Prince Charles
 Henry, Lenny; actor, writer, comedian
 Henry, Sheila; mother of 7/7 victim Christian Small
 Henson, Gavin; rugby player
 Hicks, Lady Pamela; daughter of Lord Mountbatten
 Hislop, Ian; journalist, editor of Private Eye magazine whose phone records were reportedly purchased from hackers by newspaper photographer Jason Fraser.
 Hoddle, Glenn; former England football manager
 Hoppen, Kelly; (between June 2009 and March 2010) interior designer and Sienna Miller's stepmother
 Horton, Richard; (May 2009) police constable and the anonymous author of the "Nightjack" blog that described a constable's life. He was publicly identified by The Times, reportedly as a result of computer hacking, leading to termination of the blog and to his receiving a reprimand by his police superiors.
 Hughes, Simon; politician
 Hurley, Elizabeth; model and actress
 Huthart, Eunice; winning contestant on "Gladiators", stunt double for Angelina Jolie
 Hurst, Ian; (2006) British intelligence officer, handler for agent "Stakeknife"; personal computer allegedly hacked with Trojan programme which copied emails and relayed them to the hacker, putting at risk two agents who informed on the Provisional IRA and who may have been high-risk targets for assassination. Hurst was one of the few people who knew where they were.
 Imbert, Lord; former commissioner of the Metropolitan police and a former special branch detective who investigated terrorist groups, making him a potential terrorist target. His home address and ex-directory phone number were acquired by deception from British Telecom.
 Jackson, Ben; personal assistant for Jude Law
 Jagger, Mick; singer
 Jackson, Ben; personal assistant to Jude Law
 Jefferies, Christopher; the former landlord of Joanna Yates at one time suspected in her murder and who successfully sued eight newspapers for defamation in connection with articles relating to his arrest
 Johansson, Scarlett; actress, singer; pictures of herself taken by herself may have removed from her mobile phone without her consent and posted online. The FBI is investigating.
 Johnson, Boris; London mayor
 Jones, Dave; football manager, a Fleet Street reporter bought his home address and ex-directory number.
 Jolie, Angelina; actress, wife of Brad Pitt
 Jonsson, Ulrika; TV presenter
 Jowell, Tessa; Member of Parliament and Culture Secretary, estranged wife to David Mills;
 Katona, Kerry TV personality and former Atomic Kitten singer
 Kaufman, Gerald; senior Labour politician
 Kensit, Patsy; actress, singer, model
 Keswick, Archie; friend of Sienna Miller
 King, Mervyn; Governor of the Bank of England;
 King, Anderw; husband of Sally King
 King, Sally; estate agent and friend of David Blunkett
 Khan, Jemima; (2006) writer, associate editor of The Independent
 Kirkham, Susan;
 Knatchbull, Norton; grandson of Lord Mountbatten
 Law, Jude; actor, film producer and director, ex-husband of Sadie Frost and former partner of Sienna Miller
 Lawrence, Frances wife of Philip Lawrence, who was stabbed to death at the school where he was headmaster in 1995
 Lawson, Nigella; journalist and broadcaster
 Lewis, Mark; solicitor representing as many as 70 alleged victims of phone hacking. He may also have been "put under surveillance by a private investigator acting for the News of the World"
 Leslie, John; TV presenter
 Lineker, Gary; footballer, TV presenter
 Lowther-Pinkerton, Jamie; (1 November 2005 to 9 August 2006) private secretary to Princes William and Harry
 Lumley, Joanna; Actress, author. "In one 18-month period, News International paid a total of £1,726...apparently for printouts of phone numbers she had been dialing."
 Madeley, Richard; TV presenter
 Mandelson, Peter and brother Miles Mandelson; politician
 Mansfield, Michael; barrister representing the Fayed family at Diana, Princess of Wales's inquest
 Macpherson, Elle; model
 MacShane, Denis; politician
 McAlpine, Joan; Scottish National party MSP and aide to Alex Salmond
 McCoist, Ally; football club manager, reportedly one of a dozen Scottish public figure targeted for hacking by News of the World
 McConnell, Jack and his two adult children Scottish politician, former Labor politician, peer in House of Lords; now Baron McConnell of Glenscorrodale, First Minister of Scotland from 2001 to 2007.
 McDonagh, Siobhain; (2010) Member of Parliament since 1997.
 McGuire, Fiona; acquaintance of Tommy Sheridan
 McFadden, Brian; formerly of boyband Westlife and former husband of Atomic Kitten singer Kerry Katona.
 McGuire, Mick; former deputy chief executive of the Professional Footballers' Association
 McLean-Daily, Niomi Arleen aka Ms Dynamite; A newspaper "commissioned three illegal searches of the Police National Computer at £500 a time, looking for any sign of a criminal record for Ms Dynamite, her boyfriend or her manager."
 Mellor, David; politician
 Michael, George; singer
 Middleton, Kate; then girlfriend to Prince William
 Miller, Sienna; actress, model, fashion designer, former partner of Jude Law
 Mills, David; lawyer and Tessa Jowell's estranged husband
 Mills, Heather; (2001) then girlfriend of singer Sir Paul McCartney
 Minogue, Dannii; singer, actress, television personality
 Mitchell, Clarence; spokesman for Madeleine McCann's family
 Montague, Brendon; freelance journalist
 Neil, Andrew; BBC presenter and former editor of The Sunday Times
 Nesbitt, James; actor
 Noakes, Benedict Grant; television producer, close friend of Sir Paul McCartney and Heather Mills
 Oaten, Mark; former Liberal Democrat politician
 O'Grady, Paul; presenter and comedian
 Opik, Lembit; Liberal Democrat politician
 Osborne, George; politician
 Paddick, Brian; senior officer, Metropolitan Police
 Paltrow, Gwyneth; actress and singer
 Parkes, Ciara; Sienna Miller's publicist
 Pawlby, Hannah; special adviser to Charles Clarke
 Payne, Sarah; (2000) media campaigner and mother of daughter Sarah Payne murdered by pedophile
 Pelly, Guy; London nightclub owner and a confidant of the Princes William and Harry
 Phillips, Nicola; assistant to Max Clifford
 Pitt, Brad; actor, husband of Angelina Jolie
 Prescott, John; Member of Parliament, deputy prime minister under Tony Blair
 Prince Charles and Camilla, Duchess of Cornwall
 Prince Edward, Duke of Kent and Katharine, Duchess of Kent
 Prince Edward and Sophie, Countess of Wessex and aides; (1 November 2005 to 9 August 2006)
 Prince Harry
 Prince William and aides; (1 November 2005 to 9 August 2006) members of the royal family and household
 Quinn, Kimberley; Spectator magazine publisher and friend of David Blunkett
 Rebh, George and Richard; owners of FLOORgraphics; company computer allegedly hacked
 Regan, Gaynor; the second wife of Foreign Secretary Robin Cook
 Robinson, Anne; journalist and television presenter
 Rooney, Laura; may have been targeted simply due to her last name being the same as Wayne Rooney
 Rooney, Wayne; footballer
 Ross, Jonathan; TV and radio presenter
 Rowe, Natalie; (2005) dominatrix
 Rowland, Tom; freelance journalist
 Rowling, JK; author
 Schmidt, Jade; nanny for the children of Jude Law and Sadie Frost
 Schofield, Alan; press aide to John Prescott
 Russell, Shaun; (1996) father of Josie Russell, who survived a murder attempt.
 Shear, Graham; partner at Berwin Leighton Paisner (BLP), solicitor for Mary Ellen Field and Ashley Cole
 Shearer, Alan: footballer, football manager, TV pundit
 Sheridan, Alice; mother to Tommy Sheridan
 Sheridan, Tommy; Scottish politician
 Shipman, Christopher
 Smith, Joan; author, journalist, human rights activist
 Silcott, Winston; jailed for the murder of PC Keith Blakelock during the 1985 Tottenham riot and later released
 Small, Christian; 7/7 victim
 Smith, Delia; celebrity chef, TV presenter and joint majority shareholder of Norwich City FC with husband Michael Winn-Jones
 Snowdon, Lisa; fashion model, television personality and presenter
 Stagg, Colin; accused in Rachel Nickell murder
 Stevens, John; Metropolitan Police Commissioner
 Stephens, Mark; solicitor, whose clients have included James Hewitt, Sven-Göran Eriksson; John Leslie; Sara Payne; Jemima Khan; Kerry Katona; Cornelia Crisan; David Beckham; Shaun Russell and Julian Assange, and is acting in several phone-hacking cases.
 Stirling, Angus; former director general of the National Trust
 Storie, Valerie;, gunshot victim who nearly died in the 1961 crime for which James Hanratty was hanged
 Straw, Jack; politician
 Tarrant, Chris; TV Presenter
 Taylor, Gordon; of Professional Footballers' Association;
 Temple, Tracy; former secretary to John Prescott; affair with Prescott reported by Daily Mirror in 2006.
 Tierney, Patricia; grandmother linked to Wayne Rooney
 Titmuss, Abi; model and TV presenter
 Tomlinson, Clifton; (late 1990s) son of the actor Ricky Tomlinson
 Tulloch, John; professor, survivor of the 7/7 London bombings in 2006
 Wallace, Jessie; (late 1990s) EastEnders actor
 Williams, Zoe;
 Windsor, Lord Frederick; son of Prince and Princess Michael of Kent
 Winskell, Robin; sports lawyer who has acted for footballers in disciplinary trials, Fifa arbitrations, and libel cases.
 Witness to the murder of Jill Dando; illegal privacy violation had the potential for interfering with a live police inquiry
 Woodhead, Chris; then head of the Office for Standards in Education (OFSTED)
 Wynn-Jones, Michael; writer, publisher, former editor of Sainsbury's magazine, joint majority shareholder of Norwich City FC with his wife, Delia Smith
 Yates, John; (1990s-) Assistant Commissioner in the London Metropolitan Police Service

References 

Phone hacking
Telephone tapping